Wrestle War is a video game developed and published by Sega which was released in arcades in 1989, and later ported to the Sega Mega Drive console in 1991 in Japan, Australia, and Europe. Despite being released the same year as World Championship Wrestling's WrestleWar pay-per-view event, it is not associated with any wrestling promotion. The original Japanese game cover featured a Hulk Hogan look-alike, but it was changed for the international release.

Wrestle War was included as part of the Sega Smash Pack compilation for the Dreamcast in 2001. In 2022, the original arcade version will be included as part of the Sega Astro City Mini V, a vertically-oriented variant of the Sega Astro City mini console.

Gameplay and roster
The player takes control of Bruce Blade, a rookie wrestler, through a series of matches to win the Sega Wrestling Alliance championship belt by facing the following wrestlers, each possessing their own unique wrestling moves:
Mohawk Kid
Sledge Hammer (based on Bruiser Brody)
Mr. J (based on Jason Voorhees from the Friday the 13th movie series and the real life wrestler, Jason the Terrible)
Don Dambuster (based on Road Warrior Hawk)
Mad Dog/Nim Rod Falcon (based on Lucha libre star Mil Mascaras)
Titan Morgan (based on Hulk Hogan)
Buckskin Rogers (based on Stan Hansen)
Grand Kong (based on Abdullah the Butcher)

Reception 

In Japan, Game Machine listed Wrestle War on their April 1, 1989 issue as being the second most-successful table arcade unit of the month.

References

1989 video games
Arcade video games
Sega video games
Sega Genesis games
Professional wrestling games
Sega arcade games
Multiplayer and single-player video games
Video games developed in Japan